Armon or Ukhodya, ostayutsya (transliteration of the Russian title of the film meaning "Once They Leave, They Never Return") is a 1986 Uzbek drama film directed by Melis Abzalov. The film depicts the hard work of Uzbek children, the elderly and women during the grim years of the Soviet-German war against Nazi Germany and its allies.

Plot
Boʻri loses his father at a young age in the 1920s. (His father's name was also Boʻri. Boʻri Senior is portrayed by Yodgor Saʼdiyev.) He grows up in a city and studies to become an electrician. He then returns to his village. While every girl in the village would gladly marry him, he falls in love with Xumor, who is already engaged to another man. As the Soviet-German war breaks out, Boʻri, along with his fellow villagers, leaves the village to fight in the war. He never returns.

Cast
 Boʻri (Senior) - Yodgor Saʼdiyev
 Boʻri (Junior) - Baxtiyor Zokirov
 Boyxotin - Oybarchin Bakirova
 Rais - Obid Yunusov
 Xumor - Dilorom Egamberdiyeva
 Qoʻzivoy - Diyas Rahmatov
 Oʻlmasoy - Raʼno Zokirova

References

External links
 

1986 films
1986 drama films
Soviet drama films
Uzbek-language films
Soviet-era Uzbek films
Uzbekfilm films
Uzbekistani drama films